Sanskriti is a Sanskrit word for "culture."  It may refer to:

 Sanskriti Kendra Museum, New Delhi
 Sanskriti Museum & Art Gallery, Hazaribagh
 Sanskriti Museums, a set of three museums housed within Sanskriti Kendra complex at Anandagram, an artist village complex on the outskirts of Delhi
 Sanskriti School, a recognized integrated co-educational school in the diplomatic area of Chanakyapuri, New Delhi
 Sanskriti School, Pune, a day school established in 2005
 Sanskriti The Gurukul, a boarding school on the outskirts of Guwahati, in the Indian state of Assam
 Sanskriti, publication of the Bangladeshi Ganotantrik Biplobi Jote political group